Lumban, officially the Municipality of Lumban,  is a 3rd class municipality in the province of Laguna, Philippines. It can reach this town Passing Through Rizal Province via Manila East Road or SLEX. According to the 2020 census, it has a population of 32,330 people.

It got its name from Aleurites moluccanus, a tree locally named "lumbang". The province's capital town, Santa Cruz, as well as Cavinti and Pagsanjan, were once part of Lumban. The town is the location of the river, wherein the Laguna Copperplate Inscription was found. The copperplate is the oldest known document found in the Philippines, dating to 900AD.

Lumban is the home of Lake Caliraya, a man-made lake often visited by nature lovers and sports people. It is known as the "Embroidery Capital of the Philippines". Fine Jusi and Piña cloth are embroidered by hand, and the finished product is worn by males as Barong Tagalog and by females as Saya (Filipiñana). These are export-quality items. Lumban is also known for its many designs of shoes, sandals, slippers, and step-ins - all made from local materials. They are usually sold in shopping malls in Metro Manila, albeit at slightly higher prices than what can be found in Laguna.

Geography

Barangays
Lumban is politically subdivided into 16 barangays.

Lake Caliraya

Lumban is the home of Lake Caliraya, a man-made lake.  Created in 1939, the lake has developed as a spot for water sports and outdoor recreation including fishing. Surrounding the lake are a number of resorts catering to tourists and vacation homes abound because of the local scenery and climate.

Caliraya Dam

Caliraya Dam is an embankment dam located in the town of Lumban province of Laguna, in the Sierra Madre Mountain Range of the Philippines. The reservoir created by the dam, Lake Caliraya, initially supplied one of the oldest hydroelectric plants in the Philippines, and later became a recreational area for water sports and fishing. The dam construction was started in 1939 and a small hydroelectric plant was operated in 1942.

Lake Caliraya was later connected with another man-made lake, Lumot Lake, to provide more water through a 2.3 km (1.4 mi) underground penstock. Later still the dam and lake were used as the upper reservoir for the Kalayaan Pumped-Storage Hydroelectric plant located west of Lake Caliraya, with Laguna de Bay as the lower reservoir.

Climate

Demographics

Economy

Culture

The town fiesta is held every 20'th of January in honor of San Sebastian, the town's patron saint. Lupi is held every last Sunday of January.

Feast of San Sebastian

The San Sebastian Festival is a procession held at the Lumban River, where the icon of the patron saint San Sebastian together with hundreds of devotees is afloat on “Kaskitos”, or a fleet of large boats.

The San Sebastian Festival began after the people had adopted Saint Sebastian the Martyr as their patron saint during the 18th century when the Franciscans did their mission assignment in the town. On this annual celebration, observed every 4th Sunday of January at Lumban, which is the Embroidery Capital of the Philippines, boasts of two noteworthy events that take place side by side the town fiesta.

The Moro-Moro or the “Komedya” is staged on the evening prior to the Festival. Local talents are tapped to perform the demanding roles that the comedia necessitates. Wearing colorful costumes, local actors and actresses showcase their acting prowess before spectators.

The “Paligong Poon” takes place at the Lumban River, where the Icon of the Patron Saint, San Sebastian, together with hundreds of devotees are float on “Kaskitos” (a fleet of large boats), holding lit candles and performing rituals across the river, known as “Lupi”.

Participating are civic and religious organizations and groups of bands in the locality. The icon is then paraded around the town while locals take turns in dousing the saint and devotees. Witnessed by spectators from the municipality and neighboring towns.

On this feast, each barangays of Lumban has its own icon of the patron saint which was included on their respective float. It is also included in here the 9-days novena of the Hermanas of the town.

On this feast, the people of the town make themselves totally wet in accordance to the ritual ceremony of the patron saint of Lumban.

Burdang Lumban Festival

Normally tranquil, Lumban bursts with sounds and colors every third week of September for its Burdang Lumban Festival. Aside from the fiesta in January, which has been celebrated for centuries, the town has added a festival. It has been a recent fashion in the Philippines to create festivals to attract tourism, provide citizens cause for merriment and honor and promote a unique product, industry or heritage. For Lumban, the festival promotes its centuries-old craft and industry of hand embroidery, burda in Tagalog.

Fashion designers, prominent personalities and people in the know go all the way to Lumban for its barong Tagalog, wedding gowns and embroidery, which flourished only in this town in Laguna. Lumban wants to strengthen and further its reputation for hand embroidery, and establish itself as the Embroidery Capital of the Philippines.

Embroidery remains to be the queen attraction of Lumban. And this was shown in the festival, whose highlight is the street dancing competition, in which school children dance in bright and colorful costumes inspired by the barong Tagalog and embellished with known embroidery designs. They started at the multi-purpose covered hall in front of the municipal building, marched in front of the church, through the narrow streets, and ended at the entrance of the barangay of Wawa with a showdown. Larger-than-life tambors and bastidors served as props. It was an amusing watch. Their zest and choreography led them to win a prize at the Anilag Festival, Laguna's “festival of festivals."

Gallery

References

External links

 Lumban Web Site
 [ Philippine Standard Geographic Code]
 Philippine Census Information
 Local Governance Performance Management System

Municipalities of Laguna (province)
Populated places on Laguna de Bay
Embroidery